Tanauan City held its local elections on Monday, May 9, 2022, as a part of the 2022 Philippine general election.  The voters will elect candidates for the elective local posts in the city: the mayor, vice mayor, and the 10 members of its city council.

Mayoral election
Incumbent Mary Angeline Halili is not running, initially preferring to return to private life. However, she filed her candidacy for congresswoman as a substitute candidate of Irich John Bolinas. Her oldest brother, businessman Mark Anthony Halili is running in her place. His opponent is former 3rd district representative Sonny Collantes.

Vice mayoral election
Incumbent Atty. Herminigildo Trinidad Jr. is running for reelection. He will be challenged by incumbent provincial board member and former city mayor Atty. Jhoanna Corona-Villamor, who was initially planning to run for reelection in the provincial board but her father, former board member and former mayor Alfredo Corona, Collantes' original running mate, asked her to switch places for this election. The younger Corona assumed office as Mayor in 2018 after the assassination of Mayor Antonio Halili on July 2.

City Council election

Incumbents are expressed in italics.

By ticket

Team Collantes-Corona

Team Halili-Trinidad

Councilors

|-bgcolor=black
|colspan=25|

References

2022 Philippine local elections
May 2022 events in the Philippines
2022 elections in Calabarzon
Elections in Tanauan